Emily Patricia Gibson (c.1864–24 April 1947) was a New Zealand proof-reader, feminist, socialist and internationalist. She was born in Dublin, County Dublin, Ireland on c.1864.

References

People from County Dublin
1860s births
1947 deaths
New Zealand feminists
New Zealand socialists
New Zealand socialist feminists
Irish emigrants to New Zealand (before 1923)